Crimplene is a texturised continuous fibre launched in 1959, produced by modifying Terylene. The patent was taken out by Mario Nava of Chesline and Crepes Ltd of Macclesfield, and sold to ICI Fibres. ICI licensed the product to various throwsters. The largest producer by far was William Tatton of Leek, and the Golbourne factory was at one time capable of taking the entire output of ICI's Wilton production of Terylene.

Although it was highly profitable in the 1960s, the market collapsed in the 1970s, with ICI taking control of Tattons and Qualitex to form Intex Yarns. Production was dramatically reduced, and ICI sold Intex at a later stage with it closing completely some time later.

History
Astronlon-C, a polyamide yarn, and Astralene-C, a polyester yarn,  were irritating to the skin when made into clothing. Companies had been trying for some time to find an artificial yarn alternative.

By boiling them for various periods in a domestic pressure cooker at home, Dennis Hibbert, chief textile engineer at Cheslene and Crepes Sutton Mills, Macclesfield, believed he had found the answer. Along with the chief engineer at Scraggs Ltd, Macclesfield, they designed a machine to replicate his findings.

The name "Crimplene" was chosen for two reasons. The first was that ICI had their headquarters in Harrogate; specifically nearby Crimple Valley. The word "crimp" also means to fold and intertwine. After successful trials, Dennis's wife Margaret had the first Crimplene dress, and the patent rights were sold to ICI. In 1960 an article appeared in the industries journal The Hosiery Times that caused a sensation, and Crimplene clothing was launched at high society fashion shows in London, Paris, New York and Milan.

The fabric enjoyed popularity upon its introduction in the 1960s in response to its convenient 'wash-and-wear' properties. Crimplene was often used to make the typical A-line dress of 1960s fashion. It was also popular amongst men in British mod culture for use in garish button-down shirts.

In the early 1970s, Crimplene began to fall out of fashion. Other, lighter-weight polyester fabrics like Trevira replaced Crimplene for their ease of movement and ventilation. Crimplene is seldom used today as fashion preferences have drifted towards more natural cottons.

Crimplene suits were regarded in some countries as "working-men's going-out clothes".

Mario Nava received an OBE in June 1979.

References

Polyesters
Woven fabrics
1960s fashion
Synthetic fibers